John Horace Ingham AO (10 June 19285 August 2003) was a leading Australian businessman and co-founder of the largest thoroughbred horse racing and breeding operation in Australia.

Early years and career
Born in Casula, the son of farmer Walter Ingham, he was known as "Jack" from an early age. On his father's death in 1953, along with his brother, Bob, took over Ingham Enterprises Pty Limited, a small family-run poultry breeding business founded in 1918. The brothers built the company into the largest producer of chickens and turkeys in Australia. Now headquartered in the Sydney suburb of Liverpool, the operation has annual sales of more than 1.5 billion and a workforce in excess of 6,000 people. At the time of his death in 2003, Jack Ingham was Joint Managing Director of the company.

Thoroughbred horse racing
Ingham's father had had an interest in breeding horses and, in addition to the poultry business, the brothers also inherited a broodmare named Valiant Rose. The mare was a descendant of the great British racehorse Bend Or, an Epsom Derby winner and Champion broodmare sire. The Ingham brothers used Valiant Rose to begin building what became an A$250 million breeding and racing operation, the largest in Australia. Their equine empire included Woodlands Stud at Denman in the Hunter Valley, Crown Lodge racing stables at Warwick Farm Racecourse, Sydney and Carbine Lodge racing stables at Flemington Racecourse, Melbourne, plus racing stables in Adelaide and Brisbane.

The most famous of the Inghams' successful horses was Octagonal, the 1996 Australian Horse of the Year and a winner of multiple Group One races including the Cox Plate and the Australian Derby.

Honours
In January 2003, Ingham was appointed an Officer of the Order of Australia for service to the poultry industry as a pioneer in research and development and establishment of world best practice standards, to the thoroughbred horseracing industry, and to the community. A long-time member of the executive committee of the Australian Jockey Club, in 2004 he was inducted posthumously to the Australian Racing Hall of Fame.

In 2003, at age seventy-five, Ingham died at Westmead Private Hospital, Sydney after a long struggle with leukemia.

Ingham was married three times and had five children.

References

 Woodlands Stud website with the Ingham brothers history

1928 births
2003 deaths
Australian racehorse owners and breeders
Australian Thoroughbred Racing Hall of Fame inductees
Officers of the Order of Australia
People from New South Wales